Dotzler is a surname. Notable people with the surname include:

Alexander Dotzler (born 1984), German professional ice hockey defenseman 
Hannes Dotzler (born 1990), German cross country skier 
Stefan Dotzler (born 1960), German cross country skier 
William Dotzler (born 1948), US-Politician from Waterloo, Iowa